WLCV-LP (103.9 FM, "Ludington Catholic Voice") is a radio station licensed to serve the community of Ludington, Michigan. The station is owned by Ludington Area Catholic School and airs a Catholic radio format.

The station was assigned the WLCV-LP call letters by the Federal Communications Commission on October 5, 2015.

References

External links
 Official Website
 FCC Public Inspection File for WLCV-LP
 

LCV-LP
Radio stations established in 2016
2016 establishments in Michigan
Catholic radio stations
Mason County, Michigan
LCV-LP
Catholic Church in Michigan